In the United States, the Agricultural Credit Association (ACA) is an institution of the Farm Credit System that has direct lending authority to make short-, intermediate-, and long-term loans to agricultural producers, rural homeowners and some farm-related businesses.

List 
 AgStar Financial Services
 Northwest Farm Credit Services
 Farm Credit of New Mexico

References 

Farm Credit System
Agricultural organizations based in the United States